SS Mary Cullom Kimbro was a Liberty ship built in the United States during World War II.

Construction
Mary Cullom Kimbro was laid down on 21 February 1945, under a Maritime Commission (MARCOM) contract, MC hull 2349, by J.A. Jones Construction, Panama City, Florida; she was launched on 6 April 1945.

History
She was allocated to United Fruit Co., on 24 April 1945. She was converted to an Army repair ship and renamed Corporal Eric G. Gibson, 1945. On 12 July 1949, she was laid up in the National Defense Reserve Fleet, Hudson River Reserve Fleet, Jones Point, New York. She was transferred to the US Navy, 25 April 1967, for use as an Ammunition Disposal Ship. She was scuttled with obsolete ammunition off the coast of Virginia, 15 June 1967.

References

Bibliography

 
 
 
 
 
 
 

 

Liberty ships
Ships built in Panama City, Florida
1945 ships
Hudson River Reserve Fleet